Wang Gang may refer to:

Wang Gang (actor) (born 1948), Chinese actor and TV host
Wang Gang (chef) (born 1989), Chinese chef and Internet personality
Wang Gang (footballer) (born 1989), Chinese association footballer
Wang Gang (politician) (born 1942), Chinese politician
Wang Gang (writer) (born 1960), Chinese writer

See also
Wan Gang